Iraq competed at the 2016 Summer Olympics in Rio de Janeiro, Brazil, from 5 to 21 August 2016. This was the nation's fourteenth appearance at the Summer Olympic Games since its debut in 1948.

The National Olympic Committee of Iraq selected a team of 23 male athletes to compete in six sports at the Games, with the men's football squad staging its Olympic comeback for the first time since 2004. Waheed Abdul-Ridha, Iraq's highest-ranked boxer and world no. 31 in the middleweight division, led the Iraqi team as the nation's flag bearer in the opening ceremony.

Iraq, however, failed to win its first Olympic medal, since the 1960 Summer Olympics in Rome, where Abdul Wahid Aziz took the bronze in men's weightlifting.

Boxing

Iraq has entered one boxer to compete in the men's light welterweight division into the Olympic boxing tournament. Waheed Abdul-Ridha had claimed an Olympic spot with a quarterfinal victory at the 2016 AIBA World Qualifying Tournament in Baku, Azerbaijan.

Football

Summary

Men's tournament

Iraq men's football team qualified for the Olympics with a remarkable victory over the host nation Qatar in the 2016 AFC U-23 Championship bronze medal play-off, signifying the nation's Olympic comeback to the sport for the first time since 2004.

Team roster

Group play

Judo

Iraq has qualified one judoka for the men's half-middleweight category (81 kg) at the Games, signifying the nation's Olympic return to the sport for the first time since 2004. Hussein Al-Aameri earned a continental quota spot from the Asian region as the highest-ranked Iraqi judoka outside of direct qualifying position in the IJF World Ranking List of May 30, 2016.

Rowing

Iraq has qualified one boat in the men's single sculls for the Olympics at the 2016 Asia & Oceania Continental Qualification Regatta in Chungju, South Korea.

Qualification Legend: FA=Final A (medal); FB=Final B (non-medal); FC=Final C (non-medal); FD=Final D (non-medal); FE=Final E (non-medal); FF=Final F (non-medal); SA/B=Semifinals A/B; SC/D=Semifinals C/D; SE/F=Semifinals E/F; QF=Quarterfinals; R=Repechage

Weightlifting

Iraq has qualified one male weightlifter for the Rio Olympics by virtue of a top seven national finish at the 2016 Asian Championships.
Meanwhile, an unused women's Olympic spot was added to the Iraqi weightlifting team by IWF, as a response to the vacancy of women's quota places in the individual World Rankings and to the "multiple positive cases" of doping on several nations. The National Olympic Committee of Iraq, however, chose to keep the women's place vacant, allowing the deadline of allocation to pass without selecting a female weightlifter. The team must allocate these places to individual athletes by June 20, 2016.

See also
 Iraq at the 2016 Summer Paralympics

References

External links 

 

Olympics
2016
Nations at the 2016 Summer Olympics